Results from Norwegian football in 1928.

Østlandsligaen 1927/28 (Unofficial)

Hovedserien

Østserien

Vestserien

Class A of local association leagues
Class A of local association leagues (kretsserier) is the predecessor of a national league competition.

1In the following season, local associations Lillestrøm og omegn and Eidsvoll og omegn merged to form Romerike.

Norwegian Cup

Final

National team

Sources:

Results

Nordic Football Championship

Table

References

  
Seasons in Norwegian football